Sunil S. Amrith (born 1978 or 1979) is a historian who is the Renu and Anand Dhawan Professor of History at Yale University. His research interests include transnational migration in South and Southeast Asia.

Amrith was born in Kenya to parents from Tamil Nadu, and grew up in Singapore. He received his postsecondary education and later his doctorate at the University of Cambridge, and then taught at Birkbeck, University of London until 2015, when he became a professor of South Asian history at Harvard University. He also co-directed the Joint Center for History and Economics between Harvard and the University of Cambridge, and was interim director of Harvard's Mahindra Humanities Center. In 2020, Yale University announced that they had appointed Amrith as a professor of history.

Amrith was awarded the 2016 Infosys Prize in Humanities for contributions to the fields of the history of migration, environmental history, the history of international public health, and the history of contemporary Asia. He became a MacArthur Fellow in 2017. Amrith has also authored several non-fiction books. Unruly Waters, which studies the influence of water on the political and economic development of the Indian subcontinent, was shortlisted for the 2019 Cundill History Prize. In 2022 he won the Dr A.H. Heineken Prize for History.

Works

References

External links 
 Faculty profile at Yale University

Living people
1970s births
21st-century American  historians
MacArthur Fellows
Kenyan people of Indian descent
Alumni of the University of Cambridge
Academics of Birkbeck, University of London
Harvard University faculty
Yale University faculty
Winners of the Heineken Prize